HKK Čapljina Lasta  (Croatian: Hrvatski košarkaški klub Čapljina, English: Croatian Basketball Club Čapljina) is a professional basketball team from Čapljina, Bosnia and Herzegovina. It competes in the Basketball Championship of Bosnia and Herzegovina.

History
HKK Čapljina Lasta was founded as KK Borac - Čapljina in 1973. The first official game was played against "Mladost" - Lištica (today HKK Široki). Its biggest success was promotion to Yugoslav First B Federal Basketball League. The club stopped competing with the start of the Bosnian War. In 1993 the team was renamed to HKK Čapljina Lasta, and started competing in the Herzeg-Bosnia Basketball League winning the inaugural season.

Honours
Herzeg-Bosnia Basketball League
Winner (4): 1994, 2007, 2008, 2019

Notable players 

  Dragan Bender
  Jasmin Repeša
  Veljko Mršić

References

External links
Team profile at Eurobasket.com

Basketball teams in Bosnia and Herzegovina
Basketball teams in Yugoslavia
Croatian sports clubs outside Croatia